Oriol "Uri" Rosell Argerich (born 7 July 1992) is a Spanish professional footballer who plays as a defensive midfielder.

Beginning his career at Barcelona where he was only a reserve, he spent most of his career in the United States and Portugal. He won the MLS Cup in 2013 with Sporting Kansas City and also represented Orlando City. He played 42 Primeira Liga games for four clubs including Sporting CP, where he won the Taça de Portugal in 2015.

Rosell was an international for Catalonia.

Club career

Barcelona
Born in Puig-reig, Barcelona, Catalonia, Rosell joined FC Barcelona's youth system in 2006, aged 14. He made his senior debut on 14 January 2012, playing seven minutes for the reserves in a 3–1 away loss against UD Las Palmas in the Segunda División and appearing in a further five league games during the season.

Sporting KC
Rosell signed with Sporting Kansas City of Major League Soccer in August 2012, being given the number 20 and wearing "Uri" as his jersey name. He thus became the second player to graduate from Barcelona's La Masia and play in the competition, after Albert Celades. In just his second appearance for the team, on 1 September, he scored a game-winning goal against Toronto FC, netting in the 87th minute of a 2–1 home win.

Rosell made 31 appearances in 2013, heading a goal in a 3–1 victory at Philadelphia Union in the first match of the campaign. However, in the championship game against Real Salt Lake on 7 December, he was replaced injured in the eighth minute, as his team eventually prevailed in a penalty shootout after the 1–1 draw.

On 5 April 2014, Rosell received a straight red card in a goalless draw with Real Salt Lake at Sporting Park for a foul on Devon Sandoval. On 10 May, he set an MLS record after completing 160 of 166 passes against the Montreal Impact.

Sporting CP
On 3 June 2014, Kansas City and Sporting CP agreed to a transfer for Rosell; as per MLS rules, the terms of the deal were not disclosed. He made his debut on the first day of the season, coming on for the injured Cédric Soares at half-time of the 1–1 Primeira Liga draw at Académica de Coimbra.

Rosell was sent off on 14 January 2015 in a 1–0 victory over Boavista F.C. in the group stage of the Taça da Liga at the Estádio José Alvalade, for two yellow cards in the space of three minutes. He played 22 matches in all competitions in his first year, remaining on the bench on 31 May 2015 as the Lions won the Taça de Portugal in a penalty shootout against S.C. Braga.

On 30 January 2016, Rosell was loaned to Vitória S.C. of the same league until the end of the season, featuring sparingly for both them and their reserves in the Segunda Liga. He returned to the top flight the following campaign, at Sporting neighbours C.F. Os Belenenses.

Still owned by Sporting, Rosell signed with Portimonense S.C. in late August 2017. He scored his first goal in Portuguese football on 30 October, helping the hosts defeat Vitória de Setúbal 5–2.

Orlando City
Rosell returned to MLS on 30 January 2018, when he signed with Orlando City SC via the Allocation Order; the club had acquired the top spot in the process by trading $400,000 in targeted allocation money to FC Dallas. He made his debut on 22 April, as a late substitute in a 3–2 home defeat of the San Jose Earthquakes. 

Ahead of 2020, Rosell agreed to a new two-year deal. His contract expired at the end of the following season and, despite being in discussions to return, he ultimately took to social media to announce his departure, with 73 official appearances to his credit.

Sporting KC return
On 21 December 2021, Rosell signed a two-year contract as a free agent with Sporting Kansas City, after seven years away. Rosell was waived by Kansas City on 20 January 2023.

International career
In December 2013, Rosell was called up by the unofficial Catalonia national team for its friendly match against Cape Verde at the Estadi Olímpic Lluís Companys in Barcelona on the penultimate day of the year. He entered the field as a 68th-minute substitute for Real Valladolid's Marc Valiente, and lined up with Barcelona players Jordi Alba, Sergio Busquets, Cesc Fàbregas and Gerard Piqué as the side came from behind to win 4–1.

Personal life
Rosell publicly supported Catalan independence on several occasions, saying that he would refuse to play for Spain if requested. In 2014, he added that he would vote "Yes-Yes" in the Catalan self-determination referendum.

During his professional football career, Rosell studied for university qualifications in business, at the Chemical Institute of Sarrià and the University of Missouri–Kansas City.

Career statistics

Honours
Sporting Kansas City
MLS Cup: 2013

Sporting CP
Taça de Portugal: 2014–15

References

External links

1992 births
Living people
People from Berguedà
Sportspeople from the Province of Barcelona
Spanish footballers
Footballers from Catalonia
Association football defenders
Association football midfielders
Association football utility players
Segunda División players
FC Barcelona Atlètic players
Major League Soccer players
Sporting Kansas City players
Orlando City SC players
Primeira Liga players
Liga Portugal 2 players
Sporting CP footballers
Vitória S.C. players
Vitória S.C. B players
C.F. Os Belenenses players
Portimonense S.C. players
LA Galaxy players
Catalonia international footballers
Spanish expatriate footballers
Expatriate soccer players in the United States
Expatriate footballers in Portugal
Spanish expatriate sportspeople in the United States
Spanish expatriate sportspeople in Portugal
University Ramon Llull alumni
University of Missouri–Kansas City alumni